Dumontia contorta is a relatively small epiphytic algae of the sea-shore.

Description
The fronds branch irregularly and sparingly. The branches are hollow, soft and twisted, dark reddish brown in colour which bleach towards the tips, they clearly taper at their junction.

Reproduction
The plants are dioecious (sexes separate) with microscopic spermatangia, carposporangia, and tetrasporangia developing in the surface layer, cruciate.

Habitat
Generally epilithic in rock pools of the littoral zone.

Distribution
Common around the British Isles. Europe from Russia to Portugal and Canada to United States. In the NW Pacific and Alaska.

References

Dumontiaceae